The Mayor of Frankfurt (German:  (male) or  (female), sometimes translated as "Lord Mayor") is the highest-ranking member of city government in Frankfurt, Germany. The mayor was traditionally elected by the city council. This system was replaced in 1995, and the position has been directly elected. Two people have won election since then: Petra Roth (CDU) and Peter Feldmann (SPD). Current mayor Nargess Eskandari-Grünberg (Green) assumed the office in November 2022 following a successful recall election against Feldmann. 

The mayor is "first among equals" on the city cabinet (Magistrat), and acts as the cabinet's spokesperson. The mayor is also responsible for the policies of local government departments and oversees the city's administration.

History

The Free City of Frankfurt, as a state in the Holy Roman Empire and later the German Confederation, had various leadership structures, the most durable of which saw the city with two mayors: Senior Mayor and Junior Mayor. Through the second half of the 19th century and first half of the 20th century, Frankfurt's mayors oversaw the development of Frankfurt into a major centre for trade and culture.

In 1933 following the appointment of Adolf Hitler as Chancellor of Germany, Ludwig Landmann – Frankfurt's first Jewish mayor – was expelled from the council, and Nazi Party member Friedrich Krebs was appointed in his place. Although the left-wing SPD and Communist Party had an overall majority on the council, they were excluded from the council session that confirmed Krebs' appointment.

Krebs remained in office until the US military captured the city in March 1945. The US military governorship that followed appointed trusted democrats as mayor to oversee the immediate denazification of the city administration and the beginnings of reconstruction. Council elections resumed in July 1946, and the SPD held the mayorship for the next thirty years. The rebuilding of Frankfurt was a significant topic in these years.

Following a statewide referendum, the office of mayor in Hesse became directly elected. Frankfurt's first mayoral election was held in 1995 and saw a surprise victory for CDU candidate Petra Roth over the incumbent Andreas von Schoeler (SPD). Since then, mayoral elections have been noted as especially personality-driven, and candidates regularly defy national party trends to become increasingly popular over the course of their mayoralty. Roth increased her majority over the course of her mayorship, winning in 2007 in the first round with 60.5% of the vote. After Roth resigned in 2012, Peter Feldmann (SPD) won a surprise victory over Boris Rhein (CDU), the Hessian interior minister, and he too saw a significant increase vote increase in his second election in 2018. Following various controversies, Feldmann faced a recall election in which he was recalled with 95.1% of the vote. Deputy Mayor Nargess Eskandari-Grünberg (Green) thus assumed the office and serves in a caretaker capacity until the next election scheduled for March 2023.

Oberbürgermeister since 1868
Since 1868 there have been 19 mayors of Frankfurt: 14 indirectly elected, 3 appointed and 2 directly elected.

Elections
The Mayor of Frankfurt is elected by the two-round system: if no candidate receives over 50% in the first round, a run-off is held between the top two candidates. The election is open to German and EU citizens over 18 years old who have lived in the city for at least three months. The mayor's term is 6 years – elections are brought forward if the mayor resigns or is otherwise removed from office.

2022 recall referendum

2018

2012

2007

2001

1995

See also
 Timeline of Frankfurt

Notes

References

!Mayors
Frankfurt
Hesse-related lists